Chelak is the village of Jaisalmer district from Rajasthan. this is situated in South basiya area of jaisalmer which is formally known for the brave bhati clan of rajput.

References

Villages in Jaisalmer district